The 2002–03 Sunshine Tour was the third season of professional golf tournaments since the southern Africa based Sunshine Tour was rebranded in 2000. The Sunshine Tour represents the highest level of competition for male professional golfers in the region.

There were 15 official events on the schedule. This was an decrease of eight from the previous year, and represents the fewest in the 15 seasons that Sunshine Tour has existed. There were eight tournaments from the previous season that were eliminated: the Goldfields Powerade Classic, the Bloemfontein Classic, the Randfontein Classic, the Atlantic Beach Classic, the Western Cape Classic, the Graceland Challenge, Cock of the North (Zambia), and the CABS/Old Mutual Zimbabwe Open (which resumed in 2010). The tour was based predominantly in South Africa, with 11 of the 15 official tournaments being held in the country. Two events were held in Swaziland, and one event each was held in Botswana and Zambia. Two events, the Dunhill Championship and the South African Airways Open were co-sanctioned by the European Tour.

As usual, the tour consisted of two distinct parts, commonly referred to as the "Summer Swing" and "Winter Swing". Tournaments held during the Summer Swing generally had much higher prize funds, attracted stronger fields, and were the only tournaments on the tour to carry world ranking points.

The Order of Merit was won by Trevor Immelman.

Schedule 
The following table lists official events during the 2002–03 season.

Order of Merit 
The Order of Merit was based on prize money won during the season, calculated in South African rand.

Notes

References

External links 

Sunshine Tour
Sunshine Tour
Sunshine Tour